Chepalungu Constituency is an electoral constituency in Kenya. It is one of five constituencies of Bomet County. The constituency was established for the 1966 elections.

Members of Parliament

Wards

See also 

 Bomet Central Constituency
 Sotik Constituency
 Konoin Constituency
 Bomet East Constituency

References 

Constituencies in Bomet County
Constituencies in Rift Valley Province
1966 establishments in Kenya
Constituencies established in 1966